The North–South line is a rapid transit line of the Jakarta MRT. Coloured dark red on the map, the line is currently 15.7 km long and serves 13 stations. It is the first line of the Jakarta MRT.

History

Phase 1
A total of eight contracts were awarded.

CP 101 (Construction of Lebak Bulus Depot, Lebak Bulus station and related elevated works) awarded to Tokyu Corporation - Wijaya Karya consortium.
CP 102 (Construction of Cipete Raya and Fatmawati stations and related elevated works) awarded to Tokyu Corporation - Wijaya Karya consortium.
CP 103 (Construction of Haji Nawi, Blok A, Block M and ASEAN stations and related elevated works) awarded to Obayashi Corporation - Shimizu Corporation - PT Jaya Konstruksi JV.
CP 104 (Construction of Senayan and Istora stations and related tunnelling works awarded to Shimizu Corporation - Obayashi Corporation - PT Wijaya Karya - PT Jaya Konstruksi JV.
CP 105 (Construction of Bendungan Hilir and Senayan stations and related tunnelling works awarded to Shimizu Corporation - Obayashi Corporation - PT Wijaya Karya - PT Jaya Konstruksi JV.
CP 106 (Construction of Dukuh Atas and Bundaran HI stations and related tunnelling works awarded to Sumitomo Mitsui Construction - PT Hutama Karya consortium.
CP 107 (Construction of railway systems and trackworks) awarded to Metro One consortium.
CP 108 (Construction of rolling stock) awarded to Sumitomo Corporation - Nippon Sharyo consortium.

On 1 June 2013, the first three civil contracts for the  underground section were signed. Three civil engineering contracts for the elevated section were signed in the third quarter of 2013. Construction work began in October 2013.

Tunnelling was completed on 23 February 2017, meeting the target completion date. By October 2017, the construction of both elevated and underground line sections were completed.

Ahead of its official opening, a limited public trial run was conducted from 12 March 2019 to 23 March 2019. The official opening ceremony was held on 24 March 2019 by the Indonesian president, Joko Widodo.

Phase 2

A total of eight contracts were put up.

CP 200 (Construction of underground electrical substation near Monas station) awarded to PT Trocon Indah Perkasa.
CP 201 (Construction of Thamrin and Monas stations and related tunnelling works) awarded to Shimizu Corporation - PT Adhi Karya JV.
CP 202 (Construction of Harmoni, Sawah Besar and Mangga Besar stations and related tunnelling works) awarded to Shimizu Corporation - PT Adhi Karya JV.
CP 203 (Construction of Glodok and Kota stations and related tunnelling works) awarded to Sumitomo Mitsui Construction Company - PT Hutama Karya JO.
CP 204 (Construction of depot at Ancol Barat).
CP 205 (Construction of railway systems and trackworks).
CP 206 (Construction of 14 sets of rolling stock).
CP 207 (Installation of Automatic Fare Collection system).

Groundbreaking for Phase 2 was initially planned to begin on 19 December 2018. However, due to land acquisition issues, it was pushed back to January 2019. On 30 January 2019, President Director of PT MRT Jakarta, William Sabandar announced that the groundbreaking ceremony is delayed again as the State Secretariat has yet to issue a land-use permit for the area near Medan Merdeka. The groundbreaking ceremony for Phase 2 was finally held on 24 March 2019 and advanced works began in June 2019 near the future Monas station.

Site works for contract CP201 were originally planned to begin in March 2020. However, due to the COVID-19 pandemic, it was pushed back three months, to June 2020. Site works for contract CP203 began in September 2021. Site works for CP202 began in August 2022, after multiple delays in securing a bidder.

Funding 
The Phase 1 was funded through soft loans by Japan Bank for International Cooperation, which now has merged to Japan International Cooperation Agency. The loan tenor is 30 years and a grace period of 10 years.  The first payment is made 10 years after signing the agreement.  Payments last up to 30 years afterward with an interest rate of 0.25% per annum.

Meanwhile, phase II is funded by a loan with a similar scheme by JICA but with a tenor of 40 years. The first payment is made 10 years after signing the agreement. The interest charged is 0.1% on the first stage of payment. This funding also includes part of the funding for phase I due to budget shortfalls, one of which is used to implement updated government regulations on preventing the impact of earthquakes. The debt payment burden is divided into 49% by the Jakarta Provincial Government and 51% by the Directorate General of Railways.

Network

Route 
The North–South line connects the Lebak Bulus region in South Jakarta with Ancol in North Jakarta. For now, only the 15.7 km section between Lebak Bulus Station and Bundaran Hotel Indonesia Station is operational. This line serves at least 13 stations with seven elevated stations and six underground stations. The elevated structure stretches for approximately 10 km from Lebak Bulus Station to ASEAN Station.  The underground line stretches for approximately 6 km from Senayan Station to Bundaran HI Station. The transition between elevated and underground lines is located between ASEAN Station and Senayan Station. This line is planned to intersect with the East–West Line at Thamrin Station.

Stations 
The stations on the north–south line are generally uniform. Entrance can be found on the sidewalk near the station. The access itself can be in the form of stairs, escalators, or elevators.  The second level of the underground station and elevated station is used as a commercial area or concourse. In the commercial area there are ticket doors, ticket vending machines, counters, and information centers.  The bottom level of the underground station and the top level of the elevated station are used as platforms. Each platform has a Platform Screen Door (PSD) as a means of securing passengers. All stations generally have two rail lines except Blok M Station which has three lines.

The stations also have numbers of supporting facilities, such as free WiFi and disabled-friendly toilets. In the concourse area there are ATMs and various retail kiosks. In addition, there is also a lactation room and a mushola for worship. Each station is also equipped with an intermodal integration signboard. Each station is equipped with a flood barrier, so it is ensured that all stations on the north-south line are flood-free.

It is also planned that each station will be connected to a transit-oriented development area. One of them is the Dukuh Atas Station, which is connected to the KRL Commuterline and Soekarno–Hatta Airport Rail Link through the Dukuh Atas TOD. In addition, there are transit-oriented areas at Istora Senayan Station, Blok M, ASEAN, Fatmawati, and Lebak Bulus. The development of the TODs can take the form of building public facilities and housing around the station, as well as improving access to other modes of transportation.

List of stations

Fleets 

The North–South line of the Jakarta MRT uses a fleet made by the Nippon Sharyo consortium from Japan which is also known as "Ratangga". This train consists of 16 series with six trains in each circuit. Each train has four doors on either side, except for the first and last trains which have a driver's cabin. Work on the trains began in 2015 and began to be delivered to Indonesia in 2018. The train began to fully operate in conjunction with the inauguration of this line on March 24, 2019.

Incidents 

 On November 3, 2017, an MRT line barrier fell.  The incident occurred at around 22.00 at the intersection between Jalan Panglima Polim and Jalan Wijaya II. This incident resulted in a motorcyclist being injured and hitting a car.  This incident was caused by an unbalanced crane when lifting a parapet wall. The parapet concrete that was lifted then fell from the construction site on the flyover.  It was found out after the investigation, the contractor did not follow the appropriate lifting method with the crane arm being too long and the lack of supervision from the supervisor. In addition, the lack of traffic security at the time of the incident was the cause of the victims. The Corporate Secretary of PT MRT Jakarta, Tubagus Hikmatullah said that traffic security has been carried out on some roads. However, the concrete barrier fell outside the safe area of ​​traffic restrictions because it was first caught by the crane before it actually fell onto the road.

Footnotes

References

Jakarta MRT
Railway lines in Indonesia
Railway lines opened in 2019
1500 V DC railway electrification
Standard gauge railways in Indonesia